Jason Horne-Francis (né Horne; born 21 June 2003) is a professional Australian rules footballer currently playing for the Port Adelaide Football Club in the Australian Football League, having been initially selected by the North Melbourne Football Club as the number one pick in the 2021 AFL draft. As a junior, Horne-Francis played senior-level football for the South Adelaide Football Club in the South Australian National Football League and the Christies Beach Football Club in the Southern Football League.

Football career
Horne-Francis was known as a rising star since junior football. Growing up, he supported the Fremantle Dockers. He was named the Most Valuable Player for South Australia when he captained the under-16 state team. He was also captain of the South Australian under-19 team, during which he was named in the competition's All-Australian team. He commenced playing senior-level SANFL at the age of 17, and was named best on ground in the 2021 preliminary final.

In late 2021, Horne-Francis was the first South Australian since Bryce Gibbs (2006) to be chosen as the first pick in the national draft. Upon joining the Kangaroos, Horne-Francis had the choice of numbers 6 and 18 for his jumper, and chose 6 because the number 18 was closely associated with club legend Wayne Carey, and Horne-Francis wanted to carve his own path.

Horne-Francis played his first game in the AFL in the opening round of the 2022 season, having 13 disposals and kicking one goal on North Melbourne’s narrow defeat to Hawthorn. He was part of his first victory the following week in North’s 15 point victory against West Coast. In June of his first season, he was suspended by the league for two weeks for striking an opponent.

He was traded to Port Adelaide on 10 October, signing a six-year deal keeping him at Port Adelaide until 2028.

Personal life
Horne-Francis dropped out of school in year 11 to work at the Fleurieu Milk Company, his father's milk bottle factory. He credits this experience, as well as his stepfather's influence, with maturing him as a person. Born Jason Horne, in 2021 he added the Francis name after his stepfather, former AFL player Fabian Francis. Horne-Francis' mother is Trish Francis, formerly Gully.

References

Living people
2003 births
North Melbourne Football Club players
South Adelaide Football Club players
Australian rules footballers from Adelaide
Christies Beach Football Club players